Stig Johanson (18 December 1919 – 9 April 1986) was a Swedish film actor. He appeared in 80 films between 1938 and 1974.

Selected filmography

 Sun Over Sweden (1938)
 The Two of Us (1939)
 The Three of Us (1940)
 Fransson the Terrible (1941)
 Adventurer (1942)
 I Am Fire and Air (1944)
 The Forest Is Our Heritage (1944)
 The Girls in Smaland (1945)
 The Österman Brothers' Virago (1945)
 Between Brothers (1946)
 Private Karlsson on Leave (1947)
 Music in Darkness (1948)
Sin (1948)
 Foreign Harbour (1948)
 Loffe as a Millionaire (1948)
 Lars Hård (1948)
 Bohus Battalion (1949)
 Åsa-Nisse (1949)
 The Kiss on the Cruise (1950)
 Andersson's Kalle (1950)
 Teacher's First Born (1950)
 Skipper in Stormy Weather (1951)
 In the Arms of the Sea (1951)
 Kalle Karlsson of Jularbo (1952)
 She Came Like the Wind (1952)
 One Fiancée at a Time (1952)
 Åsa-Nisse on Holiday (1953)
 Dance, My Doll (1953)
 The Road to Klockrike (1953)
 Café Lunchrasten (1954)
 Storm Over Tjurö (1954)
 Salka Valka (1954)
 Simon the Sinner (1954)
 Enchanted Walk (1954)
 Our Father and the Gypsy (1954)
 Voyage in the Night (1955)
 Far och flyg (1955)
 Darling of Mine (1955)
 The People of Hemsö (1955)
 A Little Nest (1956)
 The Hard Game (1956)
 The Girl in Tails (1956)
 Synnöve Solbakken (1957)
 Night Light (1957)
 We at Väddö (1958)
 Åsa-Nisse in Military Uniform (1958)
 Åsa-Nisse as a Policeman (1960)
 Andersson's Kalle (1972)

References

External links

1919 births
1986 deaths
Swedish male film actors
20th-century Swedish male actors